David Sale, born Ernest Swindells (Manchester, 1932) is an English-born author, television screenwriter, playwright, producer, director, actor and journalist. He emigrated to Australia in 1950, and has contributed to many TV drama series, and provided special material for Australian entertainers.

Biography

Early life
Born as Ernest Swindells in 1932 to an aircraft factory worker and his wife Lucy, (he even named the popular Number 96 character of Lucy Sutcliffe, played by Elisabeth Kirkby, after his mother) he grew up in Manchester during the years of World War II, before taking to professional writing under the pseudonym of David Sale.

Screenwriting
He is perhaps best known as creator, writer and script editor of the highly influential television soap opera Number 96. Before that, he was Executive Producer of the satirical weekly comedy The Mavis Bramston Show. Both of these series were highly rated in their day and still rank amongst the most famous and influential programs to have appeared on Australian television. He also wrote the scripts for short-lived serial The Group.

Author
His first two novels, written between TV assignments, were Come to Mother and The Love Bite. These were published in London in hardback in the 1970s and both were bought by Hollywood. Come to Mother was made into the television film Live Again, Die Again (1974).

Publications 1990s
Television interrupted this flow of books, but in the 1990s Sale resumed his career as an author with Twisted Echoes (1993) (Hodder Headline); Scorpion's Kiss (1995) (Pan Macmillan) and Hidden Agenda (1996) (Pan Macmillan).  A later book is the memoir "Number 96, Mavis Bramston and Me" (Vivid Publishing)) plus an audio version read by the author (Bolinda audio).

Theatre
He later tackled musical theatre for the first time with his co-written (book and lyrics) version of Sumner Locke Elliott's novel Careful, He Might Hear You.

Books
 Come to Mother (1971) (W. H. Allen Ltd)
 The Love Bite (1972) (W. H. Allen) 
 Chiller (1983, "based on The Love Bite") (Sphere)
 Antidote (1991) (Bantam)
 Twisted Echoes (1993) (Hodder Headline)
 Scorpion's Kiss (1995) (Pan Macmillan)
 Hidden Agenda (1996) (Pan Macmillan)
 Number 96 , Mavis Bramston and me (2013) (Vivid Publishing) David Sale

External links

References

Living people
Australian screenwriters
Australian soap opera writers
English emigrants to Australia
Australian male television writers
1932 births